The men's coxless pair competition at the 2018 Asian Games was held on 19–23 August at the JSC Lake.

Schedule 
All times are Western Indonesia Time (UTC+07:00)

Results

Heat
 Qualification: 1–6 → Final (FA)

Final

References

External links
Rowing at the 2018 Asian Games

Rowing at the 2018 Asian Games